Harald Kåre Prytz (12 September 1926 – 6 July 1994) was a Norwegian journalist and novelist.

He was born in Ålen, belonging to the Prytz family from Røros.

He became editor-in-chief of Arbeidets Rett at the age of 19 before working in Hamar Arbeiderblad from 1951 to his retirement. He wrote several novels, mainly revolving around the Norse travels to Vinland and East Greenland. He received the prize Mads Wiel Nygaards Endowment in 1972. He also wrote the nonfiction book Westward before Columbus in 1991.

He died in July 1994.

References

1926 births
1994 deaths
People from Holtålen
20th-century Norwegian novelists
20th-century Norwegian journalists